The Alamitos Energy Center (AEC), formerly AES Alamitos, is a natural gas-fired power station located in Long Beach, California. It is the second largest power station in California.

Description
Alamitos Energy Center was originally built in the 1950s by Southern California Edison and consisted of seven natural gas-fired generating units that were cooled using a seawater once-through cooling system. Units 1 and 2 generated 175 MW each, units 3 and 4 generated 320 MW each, and units 5 and 6 generate 480 MW each. Unit 7 generated an unknown amount of electricity and was decommissioned at an unknown date. The AES Corporation purchased the power station from Southern California Edison in 1998.

Modernization
On December 27, 2013, AES submitted an application to the California Energy Commission to modernize the existing power station. The project consists of a 640 MW combined cycle gas turbine (Block 1) and a 400 MW simple cycle gas turbine (Block 2), both of which use air-cooled condensers for cooling. The project also includes the construction of a 100 MW, 400 MWh battery energy storage system (BESS). Construction began in June 2017.

Block 1 was constructed between July 2019 and January 2020, and was commissioned on February 7, 2020. Block 2 is planned to be constructed between late 2020 and mid 2022. Construction of the battery energy storage system (BESS) began in June 2019, and was complete in early 2021.

Decommissioning Units 1-6
As part of the modernization project, all six operating units and the retired Unit 7 will be demolished. Units 1, 2, and 6 were decommissioned on December 31, 2019. Units 3-5 have a retirement date of December 31, 2020. However, in late 2019, AES submitted an application to the California Energy Commission to continue to operate units 3-5 for an additional 1 to 3 years. If approved, demolition of units 3-5 will be delayed for an additional 1 to 3 years.

The water quality in the Alamitos Bay could be degraded by the decommissioning of the Alamitos Energy Center pumps.  The City of Long Beach is assessing a replacement for these pumps to maintain the bay's water circulation.

Battery Storage Project
A battery facility with a capacity of 400 megawatt-hours was completed in 2021.

See also
List of power stations in California

References

Natural gas-fired power stations in California